Sanford Myron Zeller (19 October 1885 – 4 November 1948) was an American mycologist. 

Born in Coldwater, Michigan, Zeller was educated at Lawrence College in Wisconsin, then Greenville College in Illinois, from which he received a Bachelor of Science degree in 1909. He earned his doctorate in botany in 1917 at Washington University in St. Louis, and two years later started a 29-year stint as a plant pathologist and professor at the Oregon Agricultural Experiment Station in Corvallis, Oregon. He published over 150 scientific papers during his career. Zeller specialized in the gasteroid fungi. 

Independently, he described 3 orders, 9 families, 7 genera, 81 species, and published 29 new names and combinations, as well as 3 genera, 62 species, and 59 combinations in collaborations with other scientists. Zeller was the associate editor of the scientific journal Phytopathology from 1924 to 1930.

Eponymous taxa
Aleurodiscus zelleri Burt 1926
Armillaria zelleri D.E. Stuntz & A.H.Sm. 1949
Boletellus zelleri (Murrill) Singer, Snell & E.A.Dick 1960
Boletus zelleri (Murrill) Murrill 1912
Ceriomyces zelleri Murrill 1912
Craterellus zelleri Burt 1926
Elasmomyces zellerianus Singer & A.H.Sm. 1960
Exidia zelleri Lloyd 1920
Godronia zelleri Seaver 1945
Macowanites zellerianus (Singer & A.H.Sm.) Trappe, T.Lebel & Castellano 2002
Polyporus zelleri Murrill 1915
Rhizopogon zelleri A.H.Sm. 1966
Russula zelleri Burl. 1936
Tricholoma zelleri (D.E.Stuntz & A.H.Sm.) Ovrebo & Tylutki 1975
Xerocomus zelleri (Murrill) Snell 1944
Zelleromyces  Singer & A.H.Sm. 1960

References

1885 births
1948 deaths
American mycologists
Washington University in St. Louis alumni